It's All Yours is a 1937 American comedy film directed by Elliott Nugent and starring Madeleine Carroll, Francis Lederer and Mischa Auer.

Cast
 Madeleine Carroll as Linda Gray  
 Francis Lederer as Jimmy Barnes  
 Mischa Auer as Baron Rene de Montigny  
 Grace Bradley as Constance Marlowe  
 Victor Kilian as City Clerk  
 George McKay as License Clerk  
 Charles Waldron as Alexander Duncan  
 J.C. Nugent as E.J. Barnes  
 Richard Carle as Judge Reynolds  
 Arthur Hoyt as Dabney

References

Bibliography
 Ed Sikov. Screwball: Hollywood's madcap romantic comedies. Crown Publishers, 1989.

External links
 

1937 films
1937 comedy films
American comedy films
Films directed by Elliott Nugent
American black-and-white films
Columbia Pictures films
Films produced by William Perlberg
1930s English-language films
1930s American films